John Catalano (born November 3, 1949) is an American Republican Party politician, who has served in the New Jersey General Assembly since 2020, where he represents the 10th Legislative District.

Biography
A graduate of Midwestern State University, Catalano owns and operates a jewelry store. Catalano served on the Brick Township Council in 2010.

New Jersey Assembly
In March 2019, Catalano was selected by acclimation by the Ocean County Republican Party to receive the official party line for the 10th district's second assembly seat, after David W. Wolfe announced that he would be leaving the assembly after 28 years in office.

Catalano took office in the Assembly on January 15, 2020.

References

External links
Assemblyman Catalano's legislative web page, New Jersey Legislature

1949 births
Living people
American jewellers
New Jersey city council members
Republican Party members of the New Jersey General Assembly
People from Brick Township, New Jersey
Politicians from Ocean County, New Jersey
Midwestern State University alumni
20th-century American politicians
21st-century American politicians